Courthouse Center can refer to:

United States
On the National Register of Historic Places:
 Courthouse Center (Newark, Ohio)
Others:
 Courthouse Center (Miami, Florida)